This is a list of the 71 Members of Parliament (MPs) elected to the House of Commons of the United Kingdom by Scottish constituencies for the Forty-fifth parliament of the United Kingdom (1970 to Feb. 1974) at the 1970 United Kingdom general election.

Composition

List

By-elections 

 1971 Stirling and Falkirk by-election, Harry Ewing, Labour
 1973 Dundee East by-election, George Machin, Labour
 1973 Edinburgh North by-election, Alexander Fletcher, Conservative
 1973 Glasgow Govan by-election, Margo MacDonald, SNP

See also 

 Lists of MPs for constituencies in Scotland

References

Lists of MPs for constituencies in Scotland
1970 United Kingdom general election